A  was a flag used in Edo period Japan by  to notify people of a fire near or within a building. Each different group of firemen in the Edo period had their own  to identify themselves. 

References

Bibliography
 Japan Hikeshi (Firemen) Preserving Foundation

Flags of Japan
History of firefighting
Edo period
Japanese words and phrases